Sayan Namwong (born 6 March 1975) is a Thai sprinter. He competed in the men's 4 × 100 metres relay at the 1996 Summer Olympics.

References

1975 births
Living people
Athletes (track and field) at the 1996 Summer Olympics
Sayan Namwong
Sayan Namwong
Place of birth missing (living people)